Matsukawa Dam is a dam in the Nagano Prefecture, Japan, completed in 1974.

References 

Dams in Nagano Prefecture
Dams completed in 1974